Nitraria is a genus  of flowering plants in the family Nitrariaceae, native to Africa, Europe, Asia, Russia and Australia.

There are about 9 species including:
Nitraria billardierei DC., known as nitre bush or dillon bush
Nitraria retusa (Forssk.) Asch. 
Nitraria schoberi L. 
Nitraria sibirica Pall.

In religions
The Messenger of Allah(ﷺ) said, "The Last Hour will not come until the Muslims fight against the Jews, until a Jew will hide himself behind a stone or a tree, and the stone or the tree will say: 'O Muslim, there is a Jew behind me. Come and kill him,' but Al-Gharqad tree will not say so, for it is the tree of the Jews."
	  
Which means that in the Armageddon war , if a Jew hides behind any tree, he will be exposed, except for the gharqad( Nitraria), because it is their trees.

References

Nitrariaceae